The 1980 United States Senate election in Alaska was held on November 4, 1980. Incumbent Democratic United States Senator Mike Gravel ran for a third term in the United States Senate, but lost in the Democratic primary to Clark Gruening, a former state representative who was the grandson of Ernest Gruening, whom Gravel had defeated twelve years prior in an election for the same seat. Gruening later went on to lose the general election to Republican nominee Frank Murkowski, a banker.

After the loss of Gravel's seat, no Alaska Democrat would win a congressional race again until Mark Begich's narrow victory in Alaska's 2008 Senate election.

Democratic primary

Candidates 
 Clark Gruening, former Alaska State Representative
 Mike Gravel, incumbent United States Senator
 Michael J. Beasley, perennial candidate

Campaign 
First elected in 1968, by 1980 two-term Democratic incumbent Mike Gravel had become noted for a filibuster that attempted to end the draft during the Vietnam War and for including the full text of the Pentagon Papers in the Congressional Record.

Gravel faced a challenging bid for reelection, complicated by the fact that his triumph over Ernest Gruening years prior had made him a pariah in the Alaska Democratic Party. Though Gravel had campaigned to be selected as George McGovern's running mate in the 1972 presidential election and had easily won reelection to the Senate in 1974, he had never established a strong political base in Alaska.

The passage of a controversial land bill earlier in the year, as opposed to a compromise bill worked out by fellow Senator Ted Stevens that failed thanks to Gravel two years earlier, further harmed his reelection bid. A group of Democrats, including future governor Steve Cowper, campaigned against Gravel on the land bill issue.

Gravel's campaign funds, some of which came from political action committees outside the state, also became an issue in the contest. Another factor may have been Alaska's blanket primary system, which allowed unlimited cross-over voting across parties and from its large unaffiliated electorate; Republicans believed Gruening would be an easier candidate to defeat in the general election. The blanket primary had first been used in the 1968 election, and was something Gravel himself was able to capitalize on that year.

Gravel later said that by the time of his primary defeat, he had alienated "almost every constituency in Alaska."  In the August 26 primary Gruening defeated Gravel by 11 percentage points.

Results

Republican primary

Candidates 
 Frank Murkowski, president of the Alaska National Bank of the North and former Commissioner of Economic Development
 Art Kennedy
 Morris Thompson, former Bureau of Indian Affairs official
 Don Smith, Anchorage assemblyman
 Don Wright, former president of the Alaska Federation of Natives
 Dave Moe

Results

General election

Results

See also 
 1980 United States Senate elections

References 

1980
Alaska
1980 Alaska elections
Mike Gravel